is a role-playing video game developed by Japan Art Media (JAM) and published by Yanoman Corporation to an exclusively Japanese market. It was originally released for the Game Boy in 1990. A sequel to the original trilogy named Aretha the Super Famicom was later released for the Super Famicom in 1993. Aretha was the first title in the game series of the same name.

Gameplay
In the SNES version, an all-directional random encounter turn-based battle screen is used that allows enemies to attack from the rear, the side, and the front.

Plot
Aretha tells the story of Ariel, the granddaughter of a wise old grandmother who has been turned a ten-year-old, who has been given a simple task: to go through the forest to Nineveh, the nearby town, and meet a certain person while visiting the place. Eventually, Ariel uses this quest to hone her magic skills to fight the ultimate battle against evil.

Development
Aretha was developed by Japan Art Media and published by Yanoman.

Reception
The Super Famicom version of the game was on the console's top-ten bestseller list in early 1994.

Legacy
Aretha was followed by two sequels, Aretha II: Ariel no Fushigi na Tabi (ARETHA II ~アリエル不思議な旅~) and Aretha III, and a standalone side-story game Rejoice: Aretha Ōkoku no Kanata (リジョイス 〜アレサ王国の彼方〜). They were released for the same platforms between 1991–1995.

References

External links
 Aretha at MobyGames
1990 video games
Fantasy video games
Game Boy games
Japan Art Media games
Japan-exclusive video games
Japanese role-playing video games
Super Nintendo Entertainment System games
Top-down video games
Video games developed in Japan
Video games featuring female protagonists
Yanoman games
Game Arts games
Single-player video games